Philippe Roy,  (February 13, 1868 – December 10, 1948) was a Canadian physician, politician, and diplomat.

In 1906, he was appointed to the Senate of Canada representing the senatorial government division of Edmonton, Alberta. During this time he would and launch Le Courrier de l'Ouest a French language paper with future Alberta Senator Prosper-Edmond Lessard which reached a circulation of 8,000. A Liberal, he resigned in 1911. From 1911 to 1928, he was Canada's commissioner general in France. From 1928 to 1938, he was the first envoy extraordinary and minister plenipotentiary. He concurrently served as the government of Quebec's agent-general in Paris from 1911 until 1912 when the federal government required him to represent only it.

References

1868 births
1948 deaths
Canadian senators from Alberta
Liberal Party of Canada senators
Members of the King's Privy Council for Canada
Ambassadors of Canada to France